Hyperpolarized carbon-13 MRI is a functional medical imaging technique for probing perfusion and metabolism using injected substrates.

It is enabled by techniques for hyperpolarization of carbon-13-containing molecules using dynamic nuclear polarization and rapid dissolution to create an injectable solution. Following the injection of a hyperpolarized substrate, metabolic activity can be mapped based on enzymatic conversion of the injected molecule. In contrast with other metabolic imaging methods such as positron emission tomography, hyperpolarized carbon-13 MRI provides chemical as well as spatial information, allowing this technique to be used to probe the activity of specific metabolic pathways. This has led to new ways of imaging disease. For example, metabolic conversion of hyperpolarized pyruvate into lactate is increasingly being used to image cancerous tissues via the Warburg effect.

Hyperpolarization

While hyperpolarization of inorganic small molecules (like 3He and 129Xe) is generally achieved using spin-exchange optical pumping (SEOP), compounds useful for metabolic imaging (such as 13C or 15N) are typically hyperpolarized using dynamic nuclear polarization (DNP). DNP can be performed at operating temperatures of 1.1-1.2 K, and high magnetic fields (~4T). The compounds are then thawed and dissolved to yield a room temperature solution containing hyperpolarized nuclei which can be injected.

Dissolution and injection
Hyperpolarized samples of 13C pyruvic acid are typically dissolved in some form of aqueous solution containing various detergents and buffering reagents. For example, in a study detecting tumor response to etoposide treatment, the sample was dissolved in 40 mM HEPES, 94 mM NaOH, 30 mM NaCl, and 50 mg/L EDTA.

Preclinical models
Hyperpolarized carbon-13 MRI is currently being developed as a potentially cost effective diagnostic and treatment progress tool in various cancers, including prostate cancer. Other potential uses include neuro-oncological applications such as the monitoring of real-time in vivo metabolic events.

Clinical trials
The majority of clinical studies utilizing 13C hyperpolarization are currently studying pyruvate metabolism in prostate cancer, testing reproducibility of the imaging data, as well as feasibility of acquiring time.

Imaging methods

Spectroscopic imaging

Spectroscopic imaging techniques enable chemical information to be extracted from hyperpolarized carbon-13 MRI experiments. The distinct chemical shift associated with each metabolite can be exploited to probe the exchange of magnetization between pools corresponding to each of the metabolites.

Metabolite-selective excitation
Using techniques for simultaneous spatial and spectral selective excitation, RF pulses can be designed to perturb metabolites individually.
This enables the encoding of metabolite-selective images without the need for spectroscopic imaging. This technique also allows different flip angles to be applied to each metabolite,
which enables pulse sequences to be designed that make optimal use of the limited polarization available for imaging.

Dynamic imaging models

In contrast with conventional MRI, hyperpolarized experiments are inherently dynamic as images must be acquired as the injected substrate spreads through the body and is metabolized. This necessitates dynamical system modelling and estimation for quantifying metabolic reaction rates. A number of approaches exist for modeling the evolution of magnetization within a single voxel.

Two-species model with unidirectional flux

The simplest model of metabolic flux assumes unidirectional conversion of the injected substrate S to a product P. The rate of conversion is assumed to be governed by the reaction rate constant 

Exchange of magnetization between the two species can then be modeled using the linear ordinary differential equation 

where  denotes the rate at which the transverse magnetization decays to thermal equilibrium polarization, for the product species P.

Two-species model with bidirectional flux

The unidirectional flux model can be extended to account for bidirectional metabolic flux with forward rate  and backward rate  

The differential equation describing the magnetization exchange is then

Effect of radio-frequency excitation

Repeated radio-frequency (RF) excitation of the sample causes additional decay of the magnetization vector. For constant flip angle sequences, this effect can be approximated using a larger effective rate of decay computed as

Time-varying flip angle sequences can also be used, but require that the dynamics be modeled as a hybrid system with discrete jumps in the system state.

Metabolism mapping

The goal of many hyperpolarized carbon-13 MRI experiments is to map the activity of a particular metabolic pathway. Methods of quantifying the metabolic rate from dynamic image data include temporally integrating the metabolic curves, computing the definite integral referred to in pharmacokinetics as the area under the curve (AUC), and taking the ratio of integrals as a proxy for rate constants of interest.

Area-under-the-curve ratio
Comparing the definite integral under the substrate and product metabolite curves has been proposed as an alternative to model-based parameter estimates as a method of quantifying metabolic activity. Under specific assumptions, the ratio 
\frac{AUC(P)}{AUC(S)}
of area under the product curve AUC(P) to the area under the substrate curve AUC(S) is proportional to the forward metabolic rate .

Rate parameter mapping
When noise is independent and identically distributed and Gaussian, parameters can be fit using non-linear least squares estimation. Otherwise (for example if magnitude images with Rician-distributed noise are used), parameters can be estimated by maximum likelihood estimation. The spatial distribution of metabolic rates can be visualized by estimating metabolic rates corresponding to the time series from each voxel, and plotting a heat map of the estimated rates.

See also 
 Carbon-13 nuclear magnetic resonance
 Dynamic nuclear polarization
 Functional imaging
 Magnetic resonance spectroscopic imaging

References 

Magnetic resonance imaging